The prime minister of North Macedonia, officially the President of the Government of the Republic of North Macedonia, is the head of government of North Macedonia.

The prime minister is the head of the cabinet and is usually the leader of a political coalition in parliament. 

The current prime minister is Dimitar Kovačevski, who has been in office since 17 January 2022.

List of prime ministers

Socialist Republic of Macedonia

 Party

North Macedonia

 Parties

 Status

See also
President of North Macedonia
List of presidents of the Assembly of the Republic of North Macedonia
Politics of North Macedonia

Notes

References

North Macedonia
Government of North Macedonia
Politics of North Macedonia
 
Prime Minister
1991 establishments in the Republic of Macedonia